Pan is a news client for multiple operating systems, developed by Charles Kerr and others. It supports offline reading, multiple servers, multiple connections, fast (indexed) article header filtering and mass saving of multi-part attachments encoded in uuencode, yEnc and base64; images in common formats can be viewed inline. Pan is free software available for Linux, FreeBSD, NetBSD, OpenBSD, OpenSolaris, and Windows.

Pan is popular for its large feature set. It passes the Good Netkeeping Seal of Approval 2.0 set of standards for newsreaders.

Name 
The name Pan originally stood for Pimp-ass newsreader.  As Pan became an increasingly popular and polished application, the full name was perceived to be unprofessional and in poor taste, so references to it have been removed from the program and its website.

See also

List of Usenet newsreaders
Comparison of Usenet newsreaders

References

External links

Free Usenet clients
BSD software
GNOME Applications
News aggregators that use GTK
Software using the GPL license